The Oklahoma City Butcher is an unidentified serial killer who murdered three women between 1976 and 1986 in Oklahoma City. The killer murdered, dismembered, and mutilated young homeless Native American women.

Victims

Cathy Lyn Shakelford 
The first known victim was Cathy Lyn Shakelford, a member of Sac and Fox Nation. She ran away at the age of 17 and lived homeless in Oklahoma City. The last sighting of her alive was two months before her death when she was being treated at the Oklahoma City Hospital.

She was found in an abandoned house by three oil workers on April 1, 1976, who called the police after they found her head in a popcorn bucket. The rest of the victim's body was later found around the rest of the home. Her legs, arms, and torso were spread throughout the abandoned home. Her sexual organs and hand were removed and never found. These may have been kept by the killer as trophies. The perpetrator also mutilated Shakelford's face by carving a smile into it.

She remained unidentified until 1993 when her cousin, Andra Medina, reported her missing to the police. She got in contact with Sergeant Norma Adams, who connected the missing Cathy Lyn Shakelford to the unidentified woman. They were later confirmed to be the same person after DNA testing.

Arley Bell Killian 
On April 19, 1979, children playing basketball in a park discovered a human head.  Over the next few days, police found more of her remains scattered throughout the neighborhood. Some of the body parts were wrapped in bags and newspapers. The body parts had an odd absence of blood because the killer  washed them before disposing of them. Her left hand, pelvis, head, shoe, and other parts of her flesh were found.

She was identified as 22-year-old Arley Bell Killian a week later. Killian was homeless due to substance abuse caused by her father beating and raping her when she was 16. She was last seen just four hours before her head was discovered in the park.

Over the next 2 months, the police found more body parts. Some speculated that the killer was playing a game - disposing of the woman's body parts to toy with the police.

Tina Marcia Sanders 
The final victim was 22-year-old Tina Marcia Sanders, a homeless Native American woman. Her torso and left leg were found in an alleyway by a man walking in his backyard on March 6, 1986. Her head, which was set on fire, was found just a block away in a garbage bin the following week. She was quickly identified because of her tattoos. She was last seen just a day prior to her death.

Announcement of a serial killer 
Weeks after the murder of Tina Marcia Sanders, police linked her murder to murders of the previous two victims. Police believe that all of the victims were killed by a single perpetrator.  All of the victims killed, dismembered, and mutilated in a similar manner. The first two victims had unique cuts on their lower lip, all of the victims were beheaded, and the victims sexual organs were removed and never found. Furthermore, all victims were young homeless Native American women.

Suspect

Henry Lee Lucas 
Henry Lee Lucas was a drifter and American serial killer who confessed to hundreds of unsolved murders. One of these murders was Arley Bell Killian. However, it may be likely that Henry Lee Lucas was not the perpetrator because he falsely confessed to murdering hundreds of women.

See also 
 List of serial killers in the United States

References 

1976 murders in the United States
1979 murders in the United States
1986 murders in the United States
Murder in Oklahoma
Unidentified American serial killers